X Factor is a Danish television music competition to find new singing talent. Sofie Linde Lauridsen returned to host the show for the 3rd time. Thomas Blachman and Remee returned for their respective tenth and eight series as judges and were joined by a new judge Sanne Salomonsen who replaced Mette Lindberg. This season mark the end of X Factor Denmark on DR, followed an announcement made by DR on August 16. 
On December 21, 2017, TV2 announced the show would be continued the 12th series would be broadcast by them. Place on Earth won the competition and became the 3rd group to win the competition and Thomas Blachman became the winning mentor for the second time.

Judges and hosts
Sofie Linde Lauridsen returned as the host for the 3rd time and Thomas Blachman and Remee also returned, joined by a new Judge Sanne Salomonsen who replaced Mette Lindberg. On February 17 Sofie Linde became a mother after she gave birth to her first child, a daughter, named Trine. Therefore, she cannot be ready for the live shows on February 23 she will be temporarily replaced by her husband Joakim Linde Ingversen until shes ready to return again within the next 7 weeks of live shows.

Selection process

Auditions took place in Copenhagen and Aarhus.

5 Chair Challenge
The 5 Chair Challenge returned for season 11. Sanne Salomonsen mentored the 15-22s, Remee has the Over 23s and Thomas Blachman has the Groups.

The 16 successful acts were:
15-22s: Isabella, Marcus, Oliver, Sigmund, Vita
Over 23s: Anja, Jamie, Laura, Olivur, Rasmus, Vanessa
Groups: Anne Mette & Tomas, Ivalu & Judithe, Os To, Place on Earth, Sol & Christian
Laura was originally eliminated from the 5 Chair Challenge but Remee later regretted his decision. Therefore, he brought Laura back in the competition and therefore, 16 acts would be competing in Bootcamp.

Bootcamp
The Bootcamp took place at Schackenborg Slot.

The 7 eliminated acts were:
15-22s: Isabella, Marcus
Over 23s: Laura, Olivur, Vanessa
Groups: Ivalu & Judithe, Os To

Contestants

Key:
 – Winner
 – Runner-up

Live shows
The live shows started on February 23 at DR Byen.
Colour key

Contestants' colour key:
{|
|-
| – 15-22s (Salomonsen's contestants)
|-
| – Over 23s (Remee's contestants)
|-
| – Groups (Blachman's contestants)
|}

Live show details

Week 1 (February 23)
Theme: My Song

Judges' votes to eliminate
 Remee: Oliver Bendixen
 Salomonsen: Anja Nynne
 Blachman: Anja Nynne

Week 2 (March 2)
Theme: Made In Denmark
 Musical Guest: Nephew ("Amsterdam")

Judges' votes to eliminate
 Blachman: Oliver Bendixen
 Salomonsen: Anne Mette & Tomas
 Remee: Oliver Bendixen

Week 3 (March 9)
Theme: Girlpower

Judges' votes to eliminate
 Salomonsen: Sol & Christian
 Remee: Anne Mette & Tomas
 Blachman: Anne Mette & Tomas

Week 4 (March 16)
Theme: Decade 17 & 18 (Songs from year 2017 and 18)

Judges' votes to eliminate
 Salomonsen: Sol & Christian
 Blachman: Vita Jensen
 Remee: Sol & Christian

Week 5 (March 23)
Theme: Something at Heart
Group Performance: "All You Need Is Love"

Judges' votes to eliminate
 Remee: Vita Jensen
 Salomonsen: Jamie Talbot
 Blachman: Vita Jensen

Week 6: Semi-final (March 30)
 Theme: Songs from their previous performances on X Factor and duet with a special guest
 Musical Guest: Rak-Su ("Dimelo")

The semi-final did not feature a sing-off and instead the act with the fewest public votes, Sigmund Trondheim, was automatically eliminated.

After Sigmund Trondheim's elimination, he sang "Alive" by Sia.

Week 7: Final (April 6)
 Theme: Judges Choice, Andreas Kryger and Kewan Padré's Choice, Winner's Single
 Musical guest: Thomas Helmig ("Vi er de eneste to") Anne-Marie ("Friends")
 Group Performances: ("Don't Stop Me Now" performed by X Factor 2018 Contestants  and X Factor All Stars) ("Det Mig Der Står Herude og Banker"/"Den Jeg Elsker" performed by X Factor 2018 auditionees)

References

Season 11
The X Factor seasons